William Gerald Lorne MacTaggart (c. 1931 – January 12, 2017) was a Canadian football player who played for the Hamilton Tiger-Cats. He won the Grey Cup with the Hamilton Tiger-Cats in 1953. He previously attended and played football and basketball at McMaster University. MacTaggart later played with the Kitchener-Waterloo Dutchmen in the ORFU. In 1989, he was inducted into the McMaster Maurauders Hall of Fame. He died from heart failure in 2017.

References

1930s births
Hamilton Tiger-Cats players
2017 deaths
People from Orillia
Players of Canadian football from Ontario